The Women's parallel slalom competition at the FIS Freestyle Ski and Snowboarding World Championships 2023 was held on 21 February 2023.

Qualification
The qualification was started at 09:15. After the first run, the top 16 snowboarders on each course were allowed a second run on the opposite course.

Elimination round
The 16 best racers advanced to the elimination round.

References

Women's parallel slalom